Indian steel may refer to:
Iron and steel industry in India
Wootz steel, historic steel developed in India